Fraser Herman (23 January 1908 – 2 October 1972) was a Canadian rower. He competed in the men's coxless four event at the 1932 Summer Olympics.

References

1908 births
1972 deaths
Canadian male rowers
Olympic rowers of Canada
Rowers at the 1932 Summer Olympics
Sportspeople from Nova Scotia
20th-century Canadian people